Gorz is a village in Sangan Rural District, in the Central District of Khash County, Sistan and Baluchestan Province, Iran. At the 2006 census, its population was 188, in 40 families.

References 

Populated places in Khash County